Clocușna is a village in Ocnița District, Moldova.

Notable people
 Valeriu Cosarciuc 
 Emil Loteanu

References

Villages of Ocnița District
Khotinsky Uyezd

ro:Valeriu Cosarciuc